Steamboat Round the Bend is a 1935 American comedy film directed by John Ford, released by 20th Century Fox and produced by Fox Film Corporation, based on the 1933 novel of the same name by author Ben Lucien Burman. It was the final film made by star Will Rogers and was released posthumously, a month after he was killed in an airplane crash on August 15, 1935.

Plot
A con man enters his steamboat in a winner-take-all steamboat race in the 1890s with a rival while attempting to find an eyewitness that will save his nephew, who has been wrongly convicted of murder, from the gallows.

Cast
 Will Rogers as Doctor John Pearly
 Anne Shirley as Fleety Belle
 Irvin S. Cobb as Captain Eli
 Eugene Pallette as Sheriff Rufe Jeffers
 John McGuire as Duke
 Berton Churchill as New Moses
 Francis Ford as Efe
 Roger Imhof as Breck's Pappy
 Raymond Hatton as Matt Abel
 Hobart Bosworth as Chaplain
 Stepin Fetchit as Jonah

Home video
Steamboat Round the Bend was released as a region 1 DVD in 2006.

References

External links

1935 films
1935 comedy films
American comedy films
American black-and-white films
Films directed by John Ford
Films with screenplays by Dudley Nichols
Fox Film films
20th Century Fox films
1930s English-language films
1930s American films